Mr. Dodd Takes the Air is a 1937 American musical comedy film. Composer Harry Warren and lyricist Al Dubin were nominated at the 10th Academy Awards in the category of Best Song for "Remember Me".

Plot summary
A small town electrician becomes a hit singer in New York after being asked to sing for a local radio program. There he gets involved with a gold digger, a thief, an opera singer and a woman he falls in love with. After suffering from bronchitis, he sings in another voice to stay on the air, but then is called a fake.

Cast
Kenny Baker as Claude L. Dodd 
Frank McHugh as 'Sniffer' Sears 
Alice Brady as Mme. Sonia Moro 
Gertrude Michael as Jessica Stafford 
Jane Wyman as Marjorie Day 
John Eldredge as Jim Lidin  
Henry O'Neill as D.M. Gateway 
Harry Davenport as Doc Jeremiah George Quinn 
Ferris Taylor as Hiram P. Doremus
Florence Gill As Miss Carrie Bowers (Uncredited) 
Linda Perry as Information Desk Girl

References

External links 
 

 

IDMb uses picture of English actor, Kenny Baker, instead of picture of American actor, singer Kenny Baker. The American singer has pictures available to correct error.

1937 musical comedy films
1937 films
American black-and-white films
Films directed by Alfred E. Green
Films scored by Adolph Deutsch
Warner Bros. films
American musical comedy films
1930s English-language films
1930s American films